Kenya maintains relations with various countries around the world. Its closest ties are with its fellow Swahili-speaking neighbors in the African Great Lakes region. Swahili speaking neighbours mainly include countries in the East African Community such as Burundi, the DRC, Rwanda, South Sudan, Tanzania and Uganda.

Kenya's relations with other states vary. The government of Ethiopia established political links in the colonial period with Kenya's then British administration, and today it is one of several national bodies with a diplomatic presence in Nairobi. Relations with Somalia have historically been tense, although there has been some military co-ordination against insurgents.

Elsewhere, the Kenyan government has political ties with China, India, Pakistan, Russia, United Arab Emirates, and Brazil. It also maintains relations with Western countries, particularly the United Kingdom, although political and economic instabilities are often blamed on Western activities (e.g. colonialism, paternalistic engagement, and post-colonial resource exploitation).

Africa

East African Community

Rest of Africa

Americas

Asia

Europe

Oceania

Kenya and the Commonwealth of Nations
Kenya has been a member state of the Commonwealth of Nations since 1963, when it became independent. The nation became a republic in the Commonwealth of Nations in 1964.

Kenya is also a member of the UN and hosts the UN Office in Nairobi, which is the UN Headquarters in Africa. The office was established in 1996.

International trips made by presidents of Kenya

Uhuru Kenyatta 

Uhuru Kenyatta made a 119 International trips to 52 countries during his presidency. The president served two full 5-year terms and made more international official visits than any of his predecessors. Kenyatta mainly made a majority of his visits within Africa and also attended various business forums and multi-lateral international events around the world.

William Ruto

William Ruto made his first international trip in September of 2022 since he began his presidency on 13 September 2022.

See also
List of diplomatic missions of Kenya
List of diplomatic missions in Kenya

References

External links
Ministry of Foreign Affairs
Permanent Mission of Kenya to the United Nations
United States Embassy in Nairobi, Kenya

 
Kenya and the Commonwealth of Nations